The Women's Rugby World Cup is an international rugby union competition for women's national teams. The competition was first established in 1991 but the 1991 and 1994 competitions were not sanctioned at the time by the International Rugby Board (IRB, now World Rugby) and were not recognized by them until 2009. The 1998 World Cup was the first tournament sanctioned by the IRB.

New Zealand is the most successful team in the tournament by far. They have won six titles with four back-to-back victories from 1998 to 2010. England follow with two titles and the United States with one. Canada has appeared in a final only once in 2014.

History 
The United States and England contested the first women's final in April 1991. England was in the lead 6–3 at halftime with a converted penalty try by Gill Burns. However a resurgent US team ran in 16 unanswered points to claim the inaugural title.

The 1994 World Cup was held three years later to avoid coinciding with the men's World Cup. The two finalists of the 1991 World Cup seemed destined to repeat their earlier encounter. After a very entertaining match England were the second team to win the trophy.

1998 saw a new champion in New Zealand as they dominated the United States in the final with eight tries. It was the first of four consecutive titles that New Zealand would win, but not without a fight from the English.

England eventually won their second title in 2014 with a shocking exit of New Zealand in the pool stage. Canada made their first appearance in a final before succumbing to England.

New Zealand  returned to the final in 2017, playing defending champions England, it was a closely contested match with an aggregate of 73 points by the two teams. New Zealand won their fifth title.

The 2021 competition was postponed to 2022 due to the COVID-19 pandemic and produced a repeat of the 2017 final as hosts and reigning champions New Zealand faced England. England came into the match on a winning streak of 30 matches and took an early lead before Lydia Thompson was sent off for a high tackle. England preserved their lead at 26–19 at half-time but their 14 players were ultimately unable to contain New Zealand, who finally took the lead with a 71st minute try by Ayesha Leti-I'iga. The game at Eden Park was watched by a record crowd for a women's rugby union match of 42,579.

Finals

Results by nation

See also 

 Rugby World Cup

References 
 world.rugby "History - Rugby World Cup 2021" www.rugbyworldcup.com. Retrieved 2022-02-19.
 world.rugby. "Women's Rugby World Cup: The story so far - Rugby World Cup 2021". www.rugbyworldcup.com. Retrieved 2022-02-19.